The Cavnic is a right tributary of the river Lăpuș in Maramureș County, Romania. It discharges into the Lăpuș at Întrerâuri, near Copalnic-Mănăștur.

Tributaries

The following rivers are tributaries to the river Cavnic:

Left: Bloaja
Right: Valea Gutâiului, Berința

References

Rivers of Romania
Rivers of Maramureș County